National Highway 148, commonly referred to as NH 148, is a national highway of India. It is a spur road of National Highway 48. NH-148 traverses the state of Rajasthan in India. This highway is part of former NH 11A.

Route 
Manoharpur - Dausa - Lalsot.

Junctions  

  Terminal near Manoharpur.
  near Dausa.
  Terminal near Lalsot.

See also 
 List of National Highways in India
 List of National Highways in India by state

References

External links 

 NH 148 on OpenStreetMap

National highways in India
National Highways in Rajasthan